Milo Colton (born March 25, 1943) is an American politician who served in the Iowa Senate from the 1st district from 1983 to 1987.

References

1943 births
Living people
Democratic Party Iowa state senators